Mark Robert Jones (born January 17, 1953) is an American screenwriter, film director, television director, film producer, and television producer. He wrote and directed Leprechaun (1993), about the fairy tale character, beginning the horror franchise of the same name, which includes eight films in total. He also directed and co-wrote the horror film Rumpelstiltskin, also based on a fairy tale, and written for numerous television series such as The A-Team and The Highwayman. Jones wrote and directed the 2007 film Triloquist and the 2013 film Scorned.

Filmography

Film

Television

External links 

1959 births
Living people
Film producers from California
American male screenwriters
Writers from Los Angeles
American television directors
Television producers from California
Film directors from Los Angeles
Screenwriters from California